Hubert Leon Richardson (December 28, 1927 – January 13, 2020), also known as Bill Richardson, was an American gun rights activist and former politician who founded Gun Owners of America (GOA) in 1976 and served as a California state senator from 1966 to 1989.

Early life and education 
Richardson was born in Terre Haute, Indiana, in 1927 and served in the United States Navy in World War II. He attended Olympic College and the Cornish Conservatory, both in Seattle, Washington.

Career 
Richardson's political career began as a member of the John Birch Society. He was elected to the California State Senate in 1966.

During his tenure in the State Senate, Richardson served as the Republican Caucus Chair for several of these years. He was an unsuccessful Republican candidate for the United States Senate in 1974, having been defeated by incumbent Alan Cranston. He ran for Congress in 1962, and again in 1992, losing to Democrat Vic Fazio.

Richardson was credited with electing seven members of the California senate between 1978 and 1980. He led a group of organizations, including Gun Owners of America, that spent up to $1 million to elect conservative candidates.

Richardson was the author of Confrontational Politics, a book that has served as a guide for right-wing political figures, activists, and organizations.

Personal life 
He died on January 13, 2020, at the age of 92.

Bibliography
 Slightly to the Right. Whittier, California: Constructive Action, 1965.
 What Makes You Think We Read the Bills? Ottawa, Illinois: Caroline House, 1978.
 The Devil's Eye. Dallas: Word, 1995.
 The Shadows of Crazy Mountain. Dallas: Word, 1996.
 Split Ticket. Dallas: Word, 1996.
 Confrontational Politics. Ventura, California: Nordskog, 2010.

References

External links
 Slightly to the Right! blog
 GOA biography
 Join California H. L. Richardson

1927 births
2020 deaths
American gun rights activists
Republican Party California state senators
Cornish College of the Arts alumni
Politicians from Terre Haute, Indiana
Military personnel from Indiana
United States Navy personnel of World War II
Activists from California
Candidates in the 1974 United States elections
Candidates in the 1992 United States elections
20th-century American politicians
John Birch Society members